The following is a list of the 92 municipalities (comuni) of the Metropolitan City of Naples, Campania, Italy.

List

See also
List of municipalities of Italy

References

 01
 
Naples
Geography of the Metropolitan City of Naples